The 2004–05 Villanova Wildcats men's basketball team represented Villanova University in the 2004–05 college basketball season.

Villanova, led by head coach Jay Wright, put together a strong season that formed the foundation of Villanova’s re-emergence as a college basketball elite. Utilizing a starting lineup that consisted of non-seniors (juniors Randy Foye, Jason Fraser, Allan Ray, and Curtis Sumpter, along with sophomore Mike Nardi, the Wildcats played a fast-paced style of basketball that became a common topic of intrigue among analysts. Villanova entered the NCAA tournament as the No. 5 seed in the Syracuse region and made a Sweet Sixteen appearance before losing to eventual champion North Carolina. This was the first of two consecutive years the Wildcats would bow out of the tournament after facing the eventual champion.

Roster

Schedule 

|-
!colspan=9 style=| Regular season

|-
!colspan=9 style=| Big East Tournament

|-
!colspan=9 style=| NCAA Tournament

Rankings

References 

Villanova Wildcats
Villanova Wildcats men's basketball seasons
Villanova
Villanova Wildcats men's b
Villanova Wildcats men's b